Anthony is a city in Doña Ana County, New Mexico, United States. The population was 9,360 at the 2010 census. It is located on the New Mexico–Texas state line in the Upper Mesilla Valley (immediately north of Anthony, Texas), and on Interstate 10, 24 miles south of Las Cruces and 18 miles north of El Paso, Texas.

History
In an election held on January 5, 2010, Anthony residents voted in favor of incorporating the community. A total of 561 votes were cast, with 410 (73.1%) supporting the measure and 151 (26.9%) opposed. The new municipality officially came into existence on July 1, 2010.

Geography
Anthony is located at  (32.006028, -106.600669).

Demographics

The city is part of the El Paso–Las Cruces combined statistical area.

As of the census of 2010, there were 9,360 people, 2,467 households, and 1,858 families residing in the city. The population density was 2,362.4 people per square mile. The racial makeup of the city was 61.5% White, 0.8% African American, 0.5% Native American, 0.1% Asian, 0.1% Pacific Islander, and 2.5% from other races. Hispanic or Latino people of any race were 97.4% of the population.

There were 2,467 households, out of which 9.9% had children under the age of 5 living with them, 35.9% were under the age of 18, and 8.7% were over the age of 65.

The median income for a household is $22,216. The per capita income for the city was $9,239. About 40.2% of the population is below the poverty line.

Education 
Anthony is located within the Gadsden Independent School District.

Gadsden Elementary, Loma Linda Elementary and Anthony Elementary are all located within the city boundaries. Gadsden High School, Gadsden Middle School, Alta Vista Early College High School and Anthony Charter School, a satellite campus of Doña Ana Community College, and a branch of New Mexico State University all sit just outside the municipality.

Government
Following the successful incorporation vote, elections for city offices – mayor, municipal judge, and municipal trustees – were held on April 13, 2010. Ramon S. Gonzalez defeated four other candidates in the mayoral race, receiving 55.6 percent of the vote. Peggy Sue Scott was elected to the position of municipal judge. Thirteen candidates competed for the four available municipal trustee positions. They were won by Betty Gonzalez, Juan M. Acevedo, Diana Murillo, and James G. Scott. The first council meeting took place on July 7, 2010.

The final, canvassed results for the March 6 election in Anthony, are as follows:
 Mayor: Arnulfo Castañeda, 224 (winner); Juan Acevedo, 181
 Two trustees: James Scott, 231 (winner); Pilar Madrid, 255 (winner); Janny Brumlow, 160
 Municipal judge: Peggy Scott, 340 (winner)
The total number of ballots cast in the election was 1,391, according to a canvass certificate. Of those, 1,244 were cast on election day, 136 were cast in early voting and 11 were cast in absentee voting.

References

External links

 
 Community website

Cities in Doña Ana County, New Mexico
Cities in New Mexico
Former census-designated places in New Mexico
Populated places established in 2010
2010 establishments in New Mexico